"Lauda Sion" is a sequence prescribed for the Roman Catholic Mass for the feast of Corpus Christi. It was written by St. Thomas Aquinas around 1264, at the request of Pope Urban IV for the new Mass of this feast, along with Pange lingua, Sacris solemniis, and Verbum supernum prodiens, which are used in the Divine Office.

Overview
The Gregorian melody of the Lauda Sion is borrowed from the eleventh-century sequence Laetabundi iubilemus attributed to Adam of Saint Victor.

The hymn tells of the institution of the Eucharist and clearly expresses the belief of the Roman Catholic Church in transubstantiation, that is, that the bread and wine truly become the Body and Blood of Christ when consecrated by a validly-ordained priest or bishop during the Mass.

Lauda Sion is one of only four medieval sequences which were preserved in the Roman Missal published in 1570 following the Council of Trent (1545–1563)—the others being Victimae paschali laudes (Easter), Veni Sancte Spiritus (Pentecost), and Dies irae (requiem masses). (A fifth, Stabat Mater, would later be added in 1727.) Before Trent, many feasts had their own sequences. The existing versions were unified in the Roman Missal promulgated in 1570. The Lauda Sion is still sung today as a solemn Eucharistic hymn, though its use as a sequence is optional in the Ordinary Form of the Roman Rite.

As with Aquinas's other three Eucharistic hymns, the last few stanzas of the Lauda Sion are often used alone, in this case, to form the Ecce panis Angelorum.

Text 

Another translation is used in the 1981 Lectionary approved for Australia and New Zealand (Volume 1, pages 601-603). It is by James Ambrose Dominic Aylward OP (1813-1872) and was published in Annus Sanctus in 1884, pages 194-196.

See also
 Veni Creator Spiritus
 Pange lingua
 Transubstantiation

References

External links

 
 
  (with music sheet and translation)

Latin-language Christian hymns
13th-century poems
13th-century Latin literature
Medieval literature
Hymns by Thomas Aquinas
Eucharist in the Catholic Church